Hüseyin Kazım Kadri or Hüseyin Kazım Bey (1870-20 January 1934) was a statesman and writer who served as a governor and a minister in the last years of the Ottoman Empire.

Hüseyin Kazım Kadri was born in 1870 in Istanbul's Beylerbeyi district. His father was Kadri Pasha (1843-1902), who was the governor of Trabzon. Hüseyin Kazım Kadri graduated from Soğukçeşme Military High School and went to a Civil Service School. He published Tanin Newspaper together with Tevfik Fikret and Hüseyin Cahit upon the proclamation of the Constitutional Monarchy in 1908.

He was appointed as the governor of Aleppo between August 1910 and July 1911. He served as the mayor of Istanbul for a short time between July and August 1911. He put forward his candidacy in April–August 1912 and was elected as the deputy of Saruhan. When the Parliament was shut down, he was appointed as the Governor of Thessaloniki again, and was assigned to Syria during the First World War. In 1920, he was elected as a deputy from Aydın in the last  chamber of deputies and entered the parliament. He served as the Deputy First Chief in the Parliament of Deputies. He was the Minister of Court between February and March 1920, the Minister of Commerce between October 1920 and June 1921, the Minister of Foundations between June and August 1921, and the Minister of Court again between August 1921 and July 1922. He also participated in meetings between Mustafa Kemal Pasha and the Ottoman delegation in Bilecik in 1921. Although he promised Mustafa Kemal Pasha that he would not take office in the government when he returned to Istanbul in this meeting, he did not keep his promise and continued his duty as a government minister. Using the pen-name of Sheikh Muhsin-i Fani, he wrote articles in the newspapers Tanin, İkdam, İçtihad and Servet-i Fünûn on religion, economy, philosophy, language and politics.

He left politics during the Republican years. He spent his last years in his family's mansion in Beylerbeyi. He died in Tarsus in 1934. His grave is in Istanbul's Üsküdar district.

Works 

 Hak ve Hakikat (1909)
 Felaha Doğru (1921)
 İstikbale Doğru (1913 Şeyh Muhsin-i Fani müstearı ile)
 İslâmın Avrupa'ya Son Sözü (1913, yeni baskı 1999)
 Arnavutlar Ne Yaptı?(1914)
 Yirminci Asırda İslâmiyet (1913)
 Çar Nikola'ya Açık Mektup (1915)
 10 Temmuz İnkılabı ve Netâyici (1920)
 Mahdum Kulu Divanı ve Yedi Asırlık Türkçe Bir Manzume (1924)
 Nûru'l-Beyan (Kuran tefsiri, Gaziantep'li Mustafa Efendi ile birlikte 1924)
 Tarih Hatıraları (1930)
 Gazi Mustafa Kemal, Bir Milletin Ba'sü Badelmevti (1932)
 Büyük Türk Lügati I. Cilt (1927 Osmanlıca harflerle)
 Büyük Türk Lügati II. Cilt (1928 Osmanlıca harflerle)
 Büyük Türk Lügati III. Cilt (1943 Latin alfabesi TDK tarafından)
 Büyük Türk Lügati IV. Cilt (1945 Latin alfabesi TDK tarafından)
 İnsan Hakları Beyannamesi'nin İslâm Hukukuna Göre İzahı (1949 Osman Ergin tarafından yayına hazırlanmıştır)
 Ziya Gökâlp'ın Tenkidi (İsmail Kara editörlüğünde 1989)
 Meşrutiyetten Cumhuriyete Hatıralarım (İsmail Kara editörlüğünde 1991)

References 

Mayors of Istanbul
Burials at Küplüce Cemetery
Ottoman governors of Aleppo
1870 births
1934 deaths